The fahaka pufferfish (from ), also known as the Nile puffer, globe fish, lineatus puffer (Tetraodon lineatus), is a tropical freshwater pufferfish found in the upper Nile, Chad, Senegal, Gambia, Geba, Volta and Turkana basins in West, Northeast and East Africa.

Characteristics

Like all puffers they have the ability to inflate when threatened and carry the toxin tetrodotoxin. Fahaka pufferfish, like other molluscivores, feed mainly on benthic organisms which may include freshwater mussels and snails. They are typically found in large rivers, open water, weed beds and vegetated fringes.

References

fahaka pufferfish
fahaka pufferfish
fahaka pufferfish